Panopticon is an American black metal band founded by Austin Lunn in Louisville, Kentucky in 2007. Their most recent album ...And Again Into the Light was released in 2021. The band's music has been described as "wrenching in its intensity but also sweeping and spectacular" and "ideologically open-minded and musically progressive, tackling issues around self-identity, ecology, religion and politics." Lunn's lyrical style has also been noted as "natural, organic, and methodical, masterful in its writing, fiery and alive in its execution."

History 
The project began as a studio-only effort with Lunn writing all the songs and playing all instruments. A self-titled debut album was released in 2008. While Lunn remains the sole songwriter and studio musician, Panopticon has since expanded to include a lineup of musicians for live performances. The project's sound has been characterized as black metal with influences from bluegrass and Appalachian folk, with the addition of Appalachian instruments such as banjo, fiddle, bells, and acoustic guitar. Lunn's lyrics often include references to environmentalist philosophers and proponents of political anarchy. He has also tackled precise topics like the foster care system, the subjugation of Native Americans, and blue-collar labor policy.

The 2012 album Kentucky attracted the notice of several music publications, and was noted for its unusual inclusion of musical traditions from Lunn's home state. The album also included lyrics based on the issues faced by that state's residents, such as the power of the coal industry. The 2015 album Autumn Eternal included guest appearances by regional folk musicians. That album was also informed by Lunn's interests as an avid outdoorsman and lover of nature, with Pitchfork noting that "one can easily imagine a Henry David Thoreau-like figure retreating to the woods to contemplate personal, spiritual, and environmental concerns." Pitchfork later named Autumn Eternal as one of the best heavy metal albums of 2015.

The band first played live in 2016, with Lunn on guitar and vocals, accompanied by drummer Ray Capizzo, bassist Andy Klokow, and guitarist Jake Quittschreiber. The 2018 double album The Scars of Man on the Once Nameless Wilderness received attention for the incorporation of elements from country and folk music, which were integrated with traditional black metal forms. The 2021 album ...And Again into the Light was noted for integrating Lunn's many songwriting interests into a cohesive sound, with personal and family-oriented lyrics that are unusual for the black metal genre. Decibel ranked ...And Again into the Light at number five on its list of the "Top 40 Albums of 2021". Rolling Stone named it the tenth best metal album of 2021.

Discography

Studio albums
 Panopticon (2008)
 Collapse (2009)
 On the Subject of Mortality (2010)
 Social Disservices (2011)
 Kentucky (2012)
 Roads to the North (2014)
 Autumn Eternal (2015)
 The Scars of Man on the Once Nameless Wilderness (2018)
 ...And Again into the Light (2021)

Live albums
 ...Scars II (The Basics) (2019)
 Live Migration (2020)

EPs
 The Crescendo of Dusk (2019)
 Beast Rider (2020)

Compilations
 Revisions of the Past (2016)

Splits
 It's Later Than You Think (Wheels Within Wheels, 2009)
 Lake of Blood/Panopticon (Lake of Blood, 2009)
 Panopticon/When Bitter Spring Sleeps (When Bitter Spring Sleeps, 2010)
 Skagos/Panopticon (Skagos, 2010)
 Wheels Within Wheels/Panopticon II (Wheels Within Wheels, 2011)
 Vestiges/Panopticon (Vestiges, 2013)
 Brotherhood (Falls of Rauros, 2014)
 Panopticon/Waldgeflüster (Waldgeflüster, 2016)
 Panopticon/Aerial Ruin (Aerial Ruin, 2020)
 Panopticon/Nechochwen (Nechochwen, 2020)

References

American black metal musical groups
American folk metal musical groups
Musical groups established in 2007
Musical groups from Louisville, Kentucky